Dromicodryas is a genus of pseudoxyrophiid snakes found only on the island of Madagascar. They are harmless to humans.

Species
Two species are currently recognized.
Dromicodryas bernieri  –  Bernier's striped snake
Dromicodryas quadrilineatus  – four-striped snake

Nota bene: A binomial authority in parentheses indicates that the species was originally described in a genus other than Dromicodryas.

Etymology
The specific name, bernieri, is in honor of French naval surgeon Alphonse Charles Joseph Bernier (1802–1858), who collected natural history specimens in Madagascar.

References

Further reading
Boulenger G (1893). Catalogue of the Snakes in the British Museum (Natural History). Volume I., Containing the Families ... Colubridæ Aglyphæ, part. London: Trustees of the British Museum (Natural History). (Taylor and Francis, printers). xiii + 448 pp. + Plates I-XXVIII. (Dromicodryas, new genus, p. 189; species D. bernieri, pp. 189–190; species D. quadrilineatus, pp. 190–191).

External links

Pseudoxyrhophiidae
Biota of Madagascar
Reptiles of Madagascar
Snake genera
Taxa named by George Albert Boulenger